The Harlem Repertory Theatre was founded in 2004 by Keith Lee Grant, a Theatre professor at City College with a goal of making theatre accessible to the Harlem community. They primarily seek to present shows that explore issues of class and race. Harlem Rep performed for seven summer seasons at Aaron Davis Hall before moving off campus to the 133rd Street Arts Center. It was at this venue that Harlem Rep's production of Dreamgirls ran and received AUDELCO awards in a number of categories. After two years, the company moved to a larger space in the Tato Laviera Theatre in East Harlem. Among the productions at their East Harlem Home are: A Raisin in the Sun in 2017, Sweet Charity (2019), and Harburg & Saidy's Jamaica (2017).

In 2009, Harlem Rep collaborated with the Theater for the New City on Flahooley.

References

External links

Theatre in New York City
Organizations established in 2004
Harlem